Restoration War may refer to:

 Boshin War or the Japanese Meiji Restoration War (1868–1869)  
 Portuguese Restoration War (1640–1668)
 Dominican Restoration War

fr:Guerre de Restauration
pt:Guerra da Restauração (desambiguação)